Prospalta is a genus of moths of the family Noctuidae. The genus was erected by Francis Walker in 1858.

Species
 Prospalta atricupreoides Draeseke, 1928
 Prospalta contigua Leech, 1900
 Prospalta coptica Wiltshire, 1948
 Prospalta cyclina Hampson
 Prospalta definita Warren, 1914
 Prospalta enigmatica Turati & Krüger, 1936
 Prospalta immatura Warren, 1914
 Prospalta leucospila Walker, [1858]
 Prospalta ochrisquamata Warren, 1912
 Prospalta pallidipennis Warren, 1912
 Prospalta parva Leech, 1900
 Prospalta siderea Leech, 1900
 Prospalta stellata Moore, 1882
 Prospalta subalbida Warren, 1914
 Prospalta xylocola Strand, 1920

References

Hadeninae